
Year 444 BC was a year of the pre-Julian Roman calendar. At the time, it was known as the Year of the Tribunate of Atratinus, Siculus and Luscus and the Year of the Consulship of Mugillanus and Atratinus (or, less frequently, year 310 Ab urbe condita). The denomination 444 BC for this year has been used since the early medieval period, when the Anno Domini calendar era became the prevalent method in Europe for naming years.

Events 
 By place 

 Greece 
 The conservative and democratic factions in Athens confront each other. The ambitious new leader of the conservatives, Thucydides, accuses the leader of the democratic faction, Pericles, of profligacy and criticises the way Pericles is spending money on his ambitious building plans for the city. Thucydides manages, initially, to gain the support of the ecclesia. Pericles responds by proposing to reimburse the city for all the expenses from his private property, on the condition that he would make the inscriptions of dedication in his own name. His stance is supported by the ecclesia, so Thucydides' efforts to dislodge Pericles from power are defeated.

 Persian empire 
 Nehemiah, the Jewish cupbearer to Artaxerxes I at Susa, is given permission by Artaxerxes to return to Jerusalem as governor of Judea, in order to rebuild parts of it.

Births

Deaths 
 Udayin, king of Magadha in ancient India.

References 

 
Ezra–Nehemiah